Saginaw Trail is a 1953 American western film directed by George Archainbaud and starring Gene Autry and Connie Marshall. It is set in Michigan in the 1820s, and takes its name from the Saginaw Trail.

Plot

Cast
 Gene Autry as Gene Autry  
 Champion as Gene's Horse  
 Connie Marshall as Flora Tourney  
 Eugene Borden as Jules Brissac  
 Ralph Reed as Randy Lane  
 Henry Blair  as Phillipe Brissac  
 Myron Healey as Miller Webb  
 Mickey Simpson as Frenchy  
 Smiley Burnette as Smiley

References

Bibliography
 Dick, Bernard F. The Merchant Prince of Poverty Row: Harry Cohn of Columbia Pictures. University Press of Kentucky.

External links
 

1953 films
1953 Western (genre) films
1950s historical films
American historical films
American Western (genre) films
Films directed by George Archainbaud
Columbia Pictures films
Films set in the 1820s
Films set in Michigan
American black-and-white films
1950s English-language films
1950s American films